The Elf Albums (Connoisseur VSOP CD 167) is a CD compilation released in 1994.  It consists of Elf's second and third albums, Carolina County Ball (titled LA 59 in the US) and Trying to Burn the Sun, in their entirety on a single CD.  This includes the Carolina County Ball track "Happy", which was left out of The Gargantuan compilation.

Track listing
 "Carolina Country Ball" - 4:46
 "L.A. 59" - 4:21
 "Ain't It All Amusing" - 5:01
 "Happy" - 5:28
 "Annie New Orleans" - 3:01
 "Rocking Chair Rock 'n' Roll Blues" - 5:36
 "Rainbow" - 4:00
 "Do the Same Thing" - 3:10
 "Blanche" - 2:31
 "Black Swampy Water" - 3:43
 "Prentice Wood" - 4:37
 "When She Smiles" - 4:54
 "Good Time Music" - 4:30
 "Liberty Road" - 3:22
 "Shotgun Boogie" - 3:07
 "Wonderworld" - 5:03
 "Streetwalker" - 7:07

Elf (band) compilation albums
1994 compilation albums